Called Back is a 1914 British silent drama film directed by George Loane Tucker and starring Henry Ainley, Jane Gail and Charles Rock. It is based on the 1833 novel Called Back.

Cast
 Henry Ainley as Gilbert Vaughan 
 Jane Gail as Pauline March 
 Charles Rock as Macari 
 George Bellamy as Dr. Manuel Ceneri 
 Vincent Clive as Anthony March 
 Akerman May as Petroff 
 Judd Green as Drunk

References

Bibliography
 Brian McFarlane & Anthony Slide. The Encyclopedia of British Film: Fourth Edition. Oxford University Press, 2013.

External links
 

1914 films
1914 drama films
1910s English-language films
British silent feature films
British drama films
Films directed by George Loane Tucker
Films set in London
British black-and-white films
1910s British films
Silent drama films
Silent crime films